Cylisticidae is a family of woodlice in the order Isopoda. There are at least 4 genera and more than 60 described species in Cylisticidae.

Genera
These four genera belong to the family Cylisticidae:
 Cylisticus Schnitzler, 1853 (53 species)
 Lepinisticus Manicastri & Taiti, 1983 (monotypic)
 Parcylisticus Verhoeff, 1943 (10 species)
 Troglocylisticus Ferrara & Taiti, 1983 (monotypic)

References

Further reading

External links

 

Isopoda
Articles created by Qbugbot